In the mathematical theory of decisions, decision-theoretic rough sets (DTRS) is a probabilistic extension of rough set classification.  First created in 1990 by Dr. Yiyu Yao, the extension makes use of loss functions to derive  and  region parameters. Like rough sets, the lower and upper approximations of a set are used.

Definitions
The following contains the basic principles of decision-theoretic rough sets.

Conditional risk

Using the Bayesian decision procedure, the decision-theoretic rough set (DTRS) approach allows for minimum-risk decision making based on observed evidence. Let  be a finite set of 
possible actions and let  be a finite set of  states.  is
calculated as the conditional probability of an object  being in state  given the object description
The expected loss (conditional risk) associated with taking action  is given
by:

 

Object classification with the approximation operators can be fitted into the Bayesian decision framework. The
actions in classifying an object into POS(), NEG(), and BND() respectively.  To indicate whether an
Let
 denote the loss incurred by taking action  when an object belongs to
, and let  denote the loss incurred by take the same action when the object

Loss functions

Let  denote the loss function for classifying an object in  into the POS region,  denote the loss function for classifying an object in  into the BND region, and let  denote the loss function for classifying an object in  into the NEG region.

Taking individual can be associated with the expected loss actions and can be expressed as:

 

 

 

Minimum-risk decision rules

 B: If , decide BND();

where,

 

 

 

When , we get  and can simplify (P, N, B) into (P1, N1, B1):

 P1: If , decide POS();
 N1: If , decide NEG();
 B1: If , decide BND().

When , we can simplify the rules (P-B) into (P2-B2), which divide the regions based solely on :

 P2: If , decide POS();
 N2: If , decide NEG();
 B2: If , decide BND().

Data mining, feature selection, information retrieval, and classifications are just some of the applications in which the DTRS approach has been successfully used.

See also
 Rough sets
 Granular computing
 Fuzzy set theory

References

External links
 The International Rough Set Society
 The Decision-theoretic Rough Set Portal

Decision theory